Skalisty Range is a mountain range in the Greater Caucasus, Russian Federation.

Geography
The Skalisty Range is a chain of ten separate mountain massifs stretching parallel to the northern side of the Lateral Range along the Krasnodar Territory, Karachay-Cherkessia, Kabardino-Balkaria and North Ossetia federal subjects. Its high mountain massifs are separated by the upper reaches of the rivers flowing on the northern slope of the Greater Caucasus. It extends from northwest to southeast for 931 km from the upper course of the Belaya River, a left tributary of the Kuban, to the west, reaching almost the Terek River in the east, in the area of Vladikavkaz town.

The ridge has steep, in places vertical, southern slopes, while the northern slopes are gentler, though broken by numerous narrow river valleys from the basins of the Kuban and Terek rivers. There are numerous karst formations.

Flora
The northern slopes of Skalisty Range are largely covered with deciduous forests, while the southern slopes and the areas above the tree line include mountain steppe and pasture in the non-rocky areas.

See also
List of mountains and hills of Russia
Erzi Nature Reserve

References

External links

Mountain ranges of Russia
Mountain ranges of the Caucasus
North Caucasus